Dəkkəoba (also, Bala-Dekkya and Dekkyaoba) is a village and municipality in the Zardab Rayon of Azerbaijan.  It has a population of 1,191.

References 

Populated places in Zardab District